Pelitli (literally "with Acorn")  is a town in the central district (Trabzon) of  Trabzon Province, Turkey. It is a coastal town situated to the east of Trabzon Airport. The population of the town is 15503   as of 2011. During the Ottoman era after 1461,  Chepni people (a branch of Oghuz Turks ) consist the original population of the settlement. When Russians occupied the region in 1916 during the First World War, Chepnis left the settlement; but towards the end of the war, after the Russians retreated they returned. During the republican years the population of the settlement was increased and in 1995 it was declared a seat of township. In 1997, a nearby village (Yeşilköy) was merged to Pelitli.

References

Populated places in Trabzon Province
Towns in Turkey
Ortahisar
Populated coastal places in Turkey